Kacheli Lake is a high altitude lake located in Kacheli Meadows in Miacher Valley of Nagar District, Gilgit-Baltistan, Pakistan. Climbing Steeply from the miacher daman kho basecamp, It takes about two hours to reach Kacheli lake.

See also
Kacheli
Diran
Rakaposhi
Nagar Valley

References

Lakes of Gilgit-Baltistan